The Strange Case of Captain Ramper (German: Ramper, der Tiermensch) is a 1927 German silent drama film directed by Max Reichmann and starring Paul Wegener, Mary Johnson and Max Schreck. It was shot at the Staaken Studios in Berlin. The film's sets were designed by the art director Leopold Blonder. It was distributed by the German subsidiary of First National Pictures. Unlike many silent films which are now lost, copies of this still survive.

Cast
 Paul Wegener as Kapitän Ramper  
 Mary Johnson as Tony 
 Hugo Döblin as Doktor  
 Georg Guertler as Freddy  
 Camillo Kossuth as Charles Ipling  
 Max Schreck 
 Hermann Vallentin as Barbazin

References

Bibliography
 Giesen, Rolf. Nazi Propaganda Films: A History and Filmography. McFarland, 2003.

External links

1927 films
Films of the Weimar Republic
Films directed by Max Reichmann
German silent feature films
German black-and-white films
German drama films
1927 drama films
Silent drama films
Films shot at Staaken Studios
1920s German films
1920s German-language films